The 1949 Tipperary Senior Hurling Championship was the 59th staging of the Tipperary Senior Hurling Championship since its establishment by the Tipperary County Board in 1887.

Holycross-Ballycahill were the defending champions.

Borris-Ileigh won the championship after a 4-06 to 2-01 defeat of Kickhams in the final. It was their first ever championship title overall.

References

Tipperary
Tipperary Senior Hurling Championship